JRY may refer to:

People
 John Ryan (musician) (born 1987), American singer and songwriter known as John the Blind and JRY
 Jean R. Yawkey (1909–1992), owner of the Boston Red Sox from 1976 until her death in 1992

Other
 Jawahar Rozgar Yojana (JRY), a rural employment program by the Government of India
 JRY Trust, a legal entity that owned the Boston Red Sox from 1992 to 2001
 USS J.R.Y. Blakely, a destroyer escort of the United States Navy from 1943 to 1946
 John Russell Young Blakely (1872–1942), namesake of the ship

See also
 Keokuk Junction Railway (reporting mark KJRY), a railroad in the U.S. states of Illinois and Iowa